Ruth Landshoff Vollmer (1903 – 1982 New York City), was a German conceptual artist who lived and worked in the United States.

Early life 
Born in Munich in 1903 as Ruth Landshoff. Her father, Ludwig Landshoff, was a musicologist and conductor and her mother, Philippine Wiesengrund Landshoff, was an opera singer. Their family was Jewish. At age 19 she began to work as an artist and took the advice of her father to draw every day. She also had many connections to the teachers and students at the Bauhaus. In 1930 she married a pediatrician named Hermann Vollmer, whom she met in Berlin. Ruth and Hermann moved from Germany to New York in 1935.

Career 
Ruth began work designing window displays for Bonwit Teller, Tiffany's, Lord & Taylor, and other department stores. Her displays experimented with wire, steel, and copper mesh to create figural forms. In 1943, Vollmer became a U.S. citizen. In 1944 she received a commission from the Museum of Modern Art for its fifteenth anniversary exhibition, "Art in Progress." Vollmer continued to work with wire mesh and exhibited her work Composition in Space at the Museum of Modern Art in their 1948 exhibition "Elements of Stage Design." In 1950, she was commissioned to create a mural for the lobby of 575 Madison, where she created a large wall relief that used wire rods and wire mesh to play with light, texture, and transparency. Vollmer visited Giacometti for a second time during the summer of 1951. During the 1950s she begins to works with clay as well. Additionally, in 1954 she began to teach at the Children's Art Center at the Fieldston School in Riverdale and continued to teach until the mid-sixties. In 1960, she participated in the NYU discussion series "Artists on Art" with her friend Robert Motherwell. The year 1960 proved to be a significant one for Ruth Vollmer: she had her first solo exhibition at Betty Parson's Section Eleven gallery space. Throughout the 1960s Vollmer continued to work with bronze and to show her work at the Betty Parsons Gallery. In 1963, she joined the American Abstract Artists (AAA) and showed her in their exhibitions from 1963 on. By 1970 Vollmer's practice had taken on a new dimension, exploring complex geometrical forms and mathematical concepts, particularly spirals and platonic solids. Sol LeWitt wrote a short essay on Vollmer's work for Studio International titled "Ruth Vollmer: Mathematical Forms." In 1971 Ruth Vollmer participated in the protest of the cancellation of the Hans Haacke at The Solomon R. Guggenheim exhibition by writing a letter to the director, Thomas Messer. In 1976, she had a large one-person exhibition at the Neuberger Museum of Art.

Vollmer hosted artists such as Robert Smithson, Donald Judd, Sol LeWitt, Carl André, and Eva Hesse.

In 1982, Ruth Vollmer died after a long battle with Alzheimer's. A majority of her personal art collection of over one hundred sculptures, paintings, and drawings was donated to MoMA. Her personal art collection included works by Carl Andre, Mel Bochner, Eva Hesse, Sol LeWitt, Ad Reinhardt, Frank Stella, Agnes Martin, and Chryssa.

Exhibitions
1977, Group Exhibition, Betty Parsons Gallery. Mino Argento, Calvert Coggeshall, Minoru Kawabata, Richard Tuttle, Ruth Vollmer, Robert Yasuda, Helene Aylon and Cleve Gray (among others).
1978, Group Exhibition, Betty Parsons Gallery. Ruth Vollmer, Mino Argento, Cleve Gray, Calvert Coggeshall (among others)
1979–80, Group Exhibition, Betty Parsons Gallery. Mino Argento, Fanny Brennan, Richard Francisco, Richard Tuttle, Ruth Vollmer and Toko Shinoda (among others)

References

External links

 Ruth Vollmer frequently exhibited at the Betty Parsons Gallery on West 57th Street
 Ruth Landshoff Vollmer fine art prices, auction results, auction images
 "Ruth Vollmer & Gego Thinking the Line"
 "Vollmer began designing window displays for Tiffany". The New York Times
 Archives of American Art page (papers and images) for Ruth Vollmer
 Getty Union List of Artist Names for Vollmer

German artists
1903 births
1982 deaths
20th-century American painters
Artists from Munich
Painters from New York City
German emigrants to the United States